Cambridge Military Library is a public library building in Royal Artillery Park in Halifax, Nova Scotia, Canada which was created in 1886. The building was created to house the garrison library collection, which had been moved from various locations in the city since its creation in 1817.  It is the oldest library collection in Atlantic Canada. (When the library was established, there were still no bookstores in the region.) This building was the social and literary centre of military Halifax.  In 1902, the officers of the garrison requested the library be named after the Prince George, Duke of Cambridge.

History 
Along with Dalhousie College, Lord Dalhousie established the book collection with the Castine Fund, established from the fortune taken from New Ireland (Maine) during the War of 1812.  Dalhousie housed the collection in a building adjacent to the Glacis Barracks. It was later moved to Water Street before being re-established in its current location.

The original membership of the library in 1818 included: 
Col. Joseph Frederick Wallet DesBarres
Oliver Goldsmith (Canadian poet)
Sir George Head
Sir Howard Douglas
John Frederick Fitzgerald de Roos
Captain William Moorsom

By 1835, the library included the best works published in the English language. In the 1860s the library holdings were considerably augmented by a very valuable collection of books transferred from Corfu, which originated from the Garrison Library at Messinia in 1810.  By 1886, by the time the Cambridge Military Library was built, the library collection totaled 3,000 volumes.

Commemoration 

On October 29, 1934 a tablet was unveiled by Lt. Gov. Walter Harold Covert.  The historic importance of the library is reflected in those who attended the ceremony: 
 Premier Angus MacDonald
Halifax Mayor Edward Joseph Cragg
 Chief Justice Gordon Harrington
 Frank Patterson, 
 Dr. Carleton Stanley
 Harry Piers
 Commander Leonard W. Murray
Mr. D.C. Harvey
Frederick Henry Sexton
Colonel Eaton (Annapolis)
General Foster (Kentville)
Brigadier General Halfdan Hertzberg
Lt. Col. H.T. Goodeve
 Band of the Princess Louise Fusiliers

See also 
Military history of Nova Scotia

References

Sources
 Shirley Elliott. A library for the garrison and town: A history of the Cambridge Military Library, Royal Military Park, Halifax, Nova Scotia. Wolfville, Nova Scotia. 1989.
 Cambridge Military Library Royal Artillery Park of Halifax NS and GOC Residence
 Early Libraries In Halifax, by Karen Smith; NSHS, Journal #7 (2004); pp. 15.
 Rules and catalogue of the Halifax Garrison Library: with a list of the subscribers. 1835

See also 
 List of oldest buildings and structures in Halifax, Nova Scotia

Military history of Nova Scotia
Buildings and structures in Halifax, Nova Scotia